Colin Baker (born 1943) is a British actor.

Colin Baker may also refer to:

Colin Baker (Irish footballer) (born 1985), Irish footballer, also known as Colin Scanlan
Colin Baker (Welsh footballer) (1934–2021), Welsh footballer, played for Cardiff City